Todd Vernon Stottlemyre (born May 20, 1965) is an American former professional baseball player. He also played for the Oakland Athletics, St. Louis Cardinals, Texas Rangers, and the Arizona Diamondbacks.

Career
Stottlemyre was drafted by the New York Yankees in the 5th round of the 1983 amateur draft, but did not sign.  He attended Yakima Valley Community College. In 1985 Stottlemyre played collegiate summer baseball with the Harwich Mariners of the Cape Cod Baseball League and was named a league all-star. He was drafted by the St. Louis Cardinals in the 1st round (1st pick) of the 1985 amateur draft (January Secondary), but he did not sign again. 

The Toronto Blue Jays selected him out of UNLV as the third overall pick in the  MLB draft and he signed with them on August 12, 1985. He spent seven seasons with the Blue Jays, helping them win the 1992 & 1993 World Series. His best season came in 1991, when he recorded 15 wins, pitched 219 innings with an E.R.A. of 3.78. 

Stottlemyre signed with the Oakland Athletics for the 1995 season. He was traded to the Cardinals prior to the 1996 season where he put up respectable numbers for nearly three seasons. On July 31, 1998 (trade deadline day) the Cardinals traded him along with Royce Clayton to the Texas Rangers in exchange for Darren Oliver, Fernando Tatis and a player to be named later (Mark Little). Stottlemyre could not replicate the success he previously had and retired as a member of the Arizona Diamondbacks in 2002.

Scouting report
His fastball, average (high) velocity, clocked around 92-93 mph. Stottlemyre possessed above-average control of his pitches. His style of pitching was direct - using an inside fastball to challenge opposing hitters.  Furthermore, he possessed an above-average slider, curveball, and later on, a splitter (adopted from teammate Dave Stewart). His weaknesses as a pitcher, although subject to debate, were his predictability of confronting opposing hitters, pitches over the 'heart' of home plate, hittable fastballs, and flat curveballs. Changing speeds was not a part of his repertoire; Stottlemyre did not possess an effective changeup.

Incidents
While pitching for the Blue Jays in Game 4 of the 1993 World Series against the Philadelphia Phillies, Stottlemyre tried to go from first to third on a single by Roberto Alomar.  His baserunning skills indicated inexperience; he hesitated between second and third base. The attempt resulted in him being thrown/tagged out while sliding head-first into third base, and scraping his chin in the process. That prompted Ed Rendell, then the Mayor of Philadelphia, to ridicule Stottlemyre, while also adding that he could hit his pitches. After Stottlemyre and his teammates won the Series, Stottlemyre responded to the comment at the ensuing victory rally, expressing his displeasure with the mayor by declaring, "You can kiss my ass!".

On February 20, 1994, Stottlemyre and Blue Jays teammate Dave Stewart were both arrested in Dunedin, Florida, for battery on a law enforcement officer and resisting arrest after an argument arose between Stewart, who was accompanied by Stottlemyre, at a night club, reportedly over Stewart's refusal to pay a $3 cover fee.

Post-baseball career
Stottlemyre became interested in the stock market soon after receiving his signing bonus with the Blue Jays. He hired long-time family friend Frank Aiello to manage his portfolio, where Aiello purchased shares in Pepsi prior to a 3:1 stock split. After he was placed on the disabled list for the Arizona Diamondbacks in 2000, Stottlemyre began to get "really serious about trading".

After retiring from baseball in 2002, Stottlemyre became a stock market analyst for Merrill Lynch. Realizing that he was a better trader than investor, he began day trading and cites the mentorship of Joe Donohue and Brian Shannon with his success. Later, he followed his dream of founding a hedge fund.

As of 2010, Stottlemyre is a member of ACN Inc., operating a network within the multilevel marketing company selling telecommunications, energy, banking, and other  services. He is now a Platinum Regional Vice President of the company.

Stottlemyre serves on the board of directors for several companies.

Stottlemyre is married with five children. He is the son of Mel Stottlemyre, former New York Yankees pitcher. His brother Mel Stottlemyre Jr. also pitched in the major leagues for the Kansas City Royals in 1990, and is currently the pitching coach for the Miami Marlins.

See also

 List of St. Louis Cardinals team records
 List of second-generation Major League Baseball players
 List of Major League Baseball career hit batsmen leaders

References

External links

Pelota Binaria (Venezuelan Winter League)
Todd Stottlemyre's website

1965 births
American expatriate baseball players in Canada
American money managers
American stock traders
Arizona Diamondbacks players
Arizona League Diamondbacks players
Baseball players from Washington (state)
Businesspeople from Washington (state)
Cardenales de Lara players
American expatriate baseball players in Venezuela
Knoxville Blue Jays players
Living people
Major League Baseball pitchers
Oakland Athletics players
Sportspeople from Yakima, Washington
St. Louis Cardinals players
Syracuse Chiefs players
Toronto Blue Jays players
Texas Rangers players
Tucson Sidewinders players
UNLV Rebels baseball players
Ventura County Gulls players
Harwich Mariners players